The 1960 Titleholders Championship was the 21st Titleholders Championship, held March 10–14 at Augusta Country Club in Augusta, Georgia. Fay Crocker, age 45, led all four rounds and won the second of her two major titles, seven strokes ahead of runner-up Kathy Cornelius, with Mickey Wright a stroke back in third place.
 
It was the largest margin of victory at the Titleholders in a decade, since Babe Zaharias won by eight strokes in 1950.

A snowstorm on Friday postponed the second round until Saturday, and the final two rounds were played on Sunday and Monday.

Final leaderboard
Monday, March 14, 1960

Source:

References

Titleholders Championship
Golf in Georgia (U.S. state)
Titleholders Championship
Titleholders Championship
Titleholders Championship
Titleholders Championship
Women's sports in Georgia (U.S. state)